Occupational Health Science is a quarterly peer-reviewed public health journal that covers research on occupational health including empirical and theoretical articles on psychological and behavioral components of occupational health. Among the topics covered are physical health, psychological well-being, and worker safety. It was established in 2017 and is published by Springer Nature and sponsored by the Society for Occupational Health Psychology. The founding editor-in-chief is Robert R. Sinclair of (Clemson University).

Abstracting and indexing
The journal is abstracted and indexed by:
EBSCO databases
Emerging Sources Citation Index
INIS Atomindex
ProQuest databases
PsycINFO

See also
Journal of Occupational Health Psychology
Work & Stress

References

External links

Occupational safety and health journals
Springer Science+Business Media academic journals
Quarterly journals
Publications established in 2017
English-language journals